Union Township is a township in O'Brien County, Iowa, USA.

History
Union Township was founded in 1880.

References

Townships in O'Brien County, Iowa
Townships in Iowa